In physics, lattice gauge theory is the study of gauge theories on a spacetime that has been discretized into a lattice.

Gauge theories are important in particle physics, and include the prevailing theories of elementary particles: quantum electrodynamics, quantum chromodynamics (QCD) and particle physics' Standard Model. Non-perturbative gauge theory calculations in continuous spacetime formally involve evaluating an infinite-dimensional path integral, which is computationally intractable. By working on a discrete spacetime, the path integral becomes finite-dimensional, and can be evaluated by stochastic simulation techniques such as the Monte Carlo method.  When the size of the lattice is taken infinitely large and its sites infinitesimally close to each other, the continuum gauge theory is recovered.

Basics
In lattice gauge theory, the spacetime is Wick rotated into Euclidean space and discretized into a lattice with sites separated by distance  and connected by links. In the most commonly considered cases, such as lattice QCD, fermion fields are defined at lattice sites (which leads to fermion doubling), while the gauge fields are defined on the links. That is, an element U of the compact Lie group G (not algebra) is assigned to each link. Hence, to simulate QCD with Lie group SU(3), a 3×3 unitary matrix is defined on each link. The link is assigned an orientation, with the inverse element corresponding to the same link with the opposite orientation.

Thus, the composition of links' SU(3) elements along a path (i.e. the ordered multiplication of their matrices) approximates a path-ordered exponential (geometric integral), from which Wilson loop values can be calculated for closed paths.

Yang–Mills action
The Yang–Mills action is written on the lattice using Wilson loops (named after Kenneth G. Wilson), so that the limit  formally reproduces the original continuum action.  Given a faithful irreducible representation ρ of G, the lattice Yang–Mills action, known as the Wilson action, is the sum over all lattice sites of the (real component of the) trace over the n links e1, ..., en in the Wilson loop,

Here, χ is the character.  If ρ is a real (or pseudoreal) representation, taking the real component is redundant, because even if the orientation of a Wilson loop is flipped, its contribution to the action remains unchanged.

There are many possible Wilson actions, depending on which Wilson loops are used in the action. The simplest Wilson action uses only the 1×1 Wilson loop, and differs from the continuum action by "lattice artifacts" proportional to the small lattice spacing .

Measurements and calculations

Quantities such as particle masses are stochastically calculated using techniques such as the Monte Carlo method. The quantity of interest is calculated for each configuration, and averaged. Calculations are often repeated at different lattice spacings  so that the result can be extrapolated to the continuum, .

Such calculations are often extremely computationally intensive, and can require the use of the largest available supercomputers.  To reduce the computational burden, the so-called quenched approximation can be used, in which the fermionic fields are treated as non-dynamic "frozen" variables.  While this was common in early lattice QCD calculations, "dynamical" fermions are now standard.  These simulations typically utilize algorithms based upon molecular dynamics or microcanonical ensemble algorithms.

The results of lattice QCD computations show e.g. that in a meson not only the particles (quarks and antiquarks), but also the "fluxtubes" of the gluon fields are important.

Quantum triviality
Lattice gauge theory is also important for the study of quantum triviality by the real-space renormalization group. The most important information in the RG flow are what's called the fixed points.

The possible macroscopic states of the system, at a large scale, are given by this set of fixed points. If these fixed points correspond to a free field theory, the theory is said to be trivial or noninteracting.  Numerous fixed points appear in the study of lattice Higgs theories, but the nature of the quantum field theories associated with these remains an open question.

Triviality has yet to be proven rigorously, but lattice computations have provided strong evidence for this. This fact is important as quantum triviality can be used to bound or even predict parameters such as the mass of Higgs boson.

Other applications

Originally, solvable two-dimensional lattice gauge theories had already been introduced in 1971 as models with interesting statistical properties by the theorist Franz Wegner, who worked in the field of phase transitions.

When only 1×1 Wilson loops appear in the action, lattice gauge theory can be shown to be exactly dual to spin foam models.

See also
Hamiltonian lattice gauge theory
Lattice field theory
Lattice QCD
Quantum triviality
Wilson action

References

Further reading
 Creutz, M., Quarks, gluons and lattices, Cambridge University Press, Cambridge, (1985). 
 Montvay, I., Münster, G., Quantum Fields on a Lattice, Cambridge University Press, Cambridge, (1997). 
 Makeenko, Y., Methods of contemporary gauge theory, Cambridge University Press, Cambridge, (2002). .
 Smit, J., Introduction to Quantum Fields on a Lattice, Cambridge University Press, Cambridge, (2002). 
 Rothe, H., Lattice Gauge Theories, An Introduction, World Scientific, Singapore, (2005). 
 DeGrand, T., DeTar, C., Lattice Methods for Quantum Chromodynamics, World Scientific, Singapore, (2006). 
 Gattringer, C., Lang, C. B., Quantum Chromodynamics on the Lattice, Springer, (2010). 
 Knechtli, F., Günther, M., Peardon, M., Lattice Quantum Chromodynamics: Practical Essentials, Springer, (2016).

External links
 The FermiQCD Library for Lattice Field theory
 US Lattice Quantum Chromodynamics Software Libraries

Lattice field theory